Ahimsapuram is a neighbourhood in Madurai district of Tamil Nadu state in the peninsular India. Ahimsapuram has a numerous handloom weaving units that produce towels and export them to several countries. Important streets of Ahimsapuram include:
Ahimsapuram 1st street
Ahimsapuram 2nd street
Ahimsapuram 3rd street
Ahimsapuram 4th street
Ahimsapuram 5th street
Ahimsapuram 6th street
Ahimsapuram 7th street
Ahimsapuram 8th street. 

Ahimsapuram area falls under the Madurai North Assembly constituency. The winner of the election held in the year 2021 as the member of its assembly constituency is G. Thalapathi. Also, this area belongs to Madurai Lok Sabha constituency. The winner of the election held in the year 2019, as the member of its Lok Sabha constituency is S. Venkatesan.

References 

Neighbourhoods and suburbs of Madurai